Fabria is a genus of giant casemakers in the caddisfly family Phryganeidae. There is one described species in Fabria, Fabria inornata. They are found in the United States and Canada.

References

Trichoptera genera